Ether Ship was a multimedia space performance group created by Willard Van De Bogart in the late 1960s in Pittsburgh, Pennsylvania, with partner and cofounder Michael Lemon DeGeorge. They took an experimental approach to live entertainment—a live performing lab of image and sound, utilizing then-exotic technologies of expressive physical constructs, laser shows, video art, and light-form art; while playing live electronic synthesizers with radically altered instruments from mouth harp to Hammond organ, electronic cello, and classical screwdriver guitar.

Background
During concerts, Van De Bogart would sit in a space capsule and create music from there. In Jacques Vallée's book, Forbidden Science - Volume Two, Van De Bogart was said to have visualized higher entities while playing.

Career and performances
Van De Bogart and DeGeorge brought their "ship" to Disney-created California Institute of the Arts in that institution's inaugural year of 1970. At the elite school's temporary campus of Villa Cabrini, in Burbank, California, they constructed and conducted various performance experiments, in collaboration with other artists and media visionaries of the time, including Nam June Paik, Allan Kaprow, Morton Subotnick, Gene Youngblood, Serge Tcherepnin, Tom McVeety, Will Jackson, Larry Lauderborn, Sharon Grace, Naut Humon, Z'EV, et al. 

In 1972, Van De Bogart who had recently returned freedom Paris was appearing with his Electric Symphony Ensemble at Fresh Energies Theater in Pittsburgh every Saturday.

Ether Ship relocated in the San Francisco Bay area in 1974, performing over the next three decades in various forms and permutations, and appearing on cable and public media programs of various kinds.
The peak of Ether Ship's productivity was during the Haight-Ashbury studio days of 1978-79, when the group expanded in size and performed at many colleges and multimedia events. 

In 1982, what was left of the outfit was now a production company, Ether Ship Productions, which was a production co. They produced Trans-Millenia Consort, Ether Ship Records Cat no. AR3289  for Pauline Anna Strom.  The producer was Lemon DeGeorge, and the exec producer was Van de Bogart. The records were manufactured by San Jose's Arkay Records.

Post Ether Ship
Willard Van De Bogart now lives with wife and daughter in Thailand-Cambodia. He teaches at universities, and is researching obscure spiritual sites; has served as aide and consultant to the Thai government. He writes online generally of world eco-spiritual concerns.

Lemon DeGeorge has operated a sound studio in San Francisco for thirty years, and performs all over the world with a musical trio.

Several artists and musicians cycled through the ship's orbit. One collaborator—Will Jackson—undertook synthesizer experiments with wild Pacific whales as crewmember of the Greenpeace V anti-whaling expedition of 1975. He now lives in Southern California and Jamaica.

Later years
Ether Ship reunited to record again on Chinese New Year 2007.

References

American experimental musical groups